Sat Tad Masjid is a mosque situated in Mandvi division, Mumbai, India. The mosque abuts the Masjid railway station, lending the station its name.

Name 
Sat Tad Masjid means "mosque of the seven brab trees" (Borassus flabellifer), referring to a group of palms that grew in its vicinity.

History 
Sat Tad Masjid was used as the Jama Mosque of Bombay (now Mumbai) from 1770 to 1802, when the present Jama Mosque was under construction. The mosque had an annual income of Rs. 11,000 in the year 1901.

According to a panel affixed outside the Sat Tad Masjid recording the history of the mosque, the explosion that occurred in Victoria Dock in 1944 caused extensive damage to the mosque's structure, necessitating its reconstruction. Regular congregational prayers again commenced in 1951.

Administration 
Sat Tad Masjid is administrated by the Sat Tad Kadim Mosque Trust. The Trust was granted 86.96 square meters land adjoining the mosque on lease by the Collector of Bombay in 1944.

References 

Mosques in Mumbai